Susagna Arasanz i Serra (1960/1961 – 14 October 2021) was an Andorran economist and politician, minister of finance between 1994 and 2000, becoming the first woman to hold the office, under the premiership of Marc Forné.

On 22 December 1994, Forné named her the new minister of Finance, replacing Josep Casal Casa. She was elected member of the General Council of Andorra in the 1997 parliamentary election and on 1 April 1997 she was re-appointed minister of Finance resigning as lawmaker two weeks later. She was member of the Liberal Party of Andorra. On 15 March 2000 Susagna Arasanz resigned as minister.

She was member of the Andorran Social Security Fund's (CASS) Board of Directors since she was appointed by the government of Andorra in January 2020.

Arasanz died on 14 October 2021 at the age of 60 from cancer.

References

1960s births
Year of birth missing
2021 deaths
Liberal Party of Andorra politicians
Members of the General Council (Andorra)
Women government ministers of Andorra
Finance Ministers of Andorra
20th-century women politicians
Female finance ministers